Chilliwack General Hospital is a community hospital facility located in Chilliwack, British Columbia, which is operated by the Fraser Health Authority (FHA).

History 
Opened on 28 February 1912, the original building was replaced by a new hospital building, opened on 19 June 1940.

In 1993, Chilliwack General Hospital was the first hospital in  British Columbia to adopt Patient Focused Care (PFC), a consultant driven approach to providing healthcare services. Both St. Boniface General Hospital and the Winnipeg Health Science Centre had previously adopted the solution in Canada.

A $35 million expansion to the hospital's healthcare facilities was opened in 2011.

Chilliwack General Hospital is an affiliated hospital with the University of British Columbia Faculty of Medicine. Classified as an Affiliated Region Center, the hospital is a training facility for the Family Medicine Residency Program.

Philanthropy 
The hospital's capital costs are financially supported by both the Chilliwack Hospital Foundation and the Fraser Valley Health Care Foundation.

Amenities 
Chilliwack General Hospital offers numerous healthcare services including:

 24/7 Emergency services
Emergency medicine
Internal medicine
Orthopedics
Urology
Obstetrics and gynecology
Ophthalmology 
ENT 
Pediatrics 
Radiology 
Psychiatry 
Pathology 
Anesthesia 
Geriatrics 
Palliative care

References 
 https://pulse/clinical/aboriginal/PublishingImages/Pages/Cultural-Protocols-&-Guidelines/Protocol%20Traditional%20Territory%20Acknowledgements%2005.2020.pdf#search=initiatives%20cultural%20safety

External links 

 Fraser Health
 Fraser Health - Chilliwack General Hospital
 Chilliwack Hospital Foundation
Fraser Valley Healthcare Foundation

Hospitals in British Columbia